B. M. Close's Ground was a cricket ground at Southborough in the English county of Kent. The ground was established in 1859 by Robert Winnifrith on land owned by George Newnham of Horsemunden Farm and was described in 1862 as "one of the best cricket grounds in Kent". The first recorded match on the ground was in 1859, when a Tunbridge Wells side played a New All-England Eleven.

A cricket pavilion was built on the ground in 1860 and it was used by sides from Tunbridge Wells and Southborough during the early-1860s. In 1867, Kent County Cricket Club played a county match against Hampshire in the ground's only first-class cricket match. The ground, which also appears to have been known as the Paragon Cricket Ground, was used for three matches between Southborough and the Gentlemen of Kent at around the same period, but appears to have gone out of use soon afterwards, with Southborough matches transferring to Southborough Common.

The final recorded match held on the ground saw Southborough play a team of Surrey Professionals in 1879. In the 1930s the site of the ground, which was probably to the west of the centre of Southborough, was built on and a housing estate covers the general area of the ground today.

Cricket is still played on the Common in the town by Southborough Cricket Club. Their ground was used by Kent Women a number of times between 1957 and 1971 and remains in use today. Kent have played over 200 matches at the Nevill Ground in Tunbridge Wells  to the south and 106 matches at the Angel Ground in Tonbridge  to the north.

References

External links
B. M. Close's Ground on Cricinfo

Defunct cricket grounds in England
Cricket grounds in Kent
Defunct sports venues in Kent